Wittenburg is a town in the district Ludwigslust-Parchim in Mecklenburg-Vorpommern, Germany. Population 6,092, area 80.0 km².

Wittenburg has been the seat of the Amt of Wittenburg since January 2004. It is in the west of Mecklenburg-Vorpommern and lies on the little river Motel.

The settlements of Helm, Klein Wolde, Wölzow, Lehsen, Körchow and Ziggelmark are part of Wittenburg.

At the beginning of the 12th century, Wittenburg belonged to the territory of the Polaben Obotrites. Wittenburg was first mentioned in 1154 and gained town privileges in 1230.

Number of inhabitants

Notable people 
 Harald Ringstorff (born 1939), politician (SPD)

Gallery

References

External links
 Official website (German)

Cities and towns in Mecklenburg
Ludwigslust-Parchim
Populated places established in the 13th century
1230s establishments in the Holy Roman Empire
1230 establishments in Europe
Grand Duchy of Mecklenburg-Schwerin